The Tha Thung Na Dam is a multi-purpose hydroelectric dam in the Mueang Kanchanaburi District of Kanchanaburi Province, Thailand. It impounds the Khwae Yai River. The dam is located at the southeastern corner of Erawan National Park.

Description
Tha Thung Na Dam is a rock fill and concrete gravity dam.

Power plant
The dam's power plant has two hydroelectric generating units, each with an installed capacity of 19 MW. The first unit was commissioned in December 1981 and the second unit in February 1982.

References

Dams in Thailand
Rock-filled dams
Hydroelectric power stations in Thailand
1982 establishments in Thailand
Buildings and structures in Kanchanaburi province
Energy infrastructure completed in 1982
Dams completed in 1981